Brian Phelan Brady (born July 11, 1962) is an American former professional baseball right fielder who played briefly for the California Angels of Major League Baseball (MLB) during the  season. Listed at 5' 11", 185 lb., Brady batted and threw left-handed. A native of  Elmhurst, New York, he attended New York Institute of Technology.

Career
Brady was selected by the California Angels in the 6th round of the 1984 MLB draft. He spent six years in the Angels minor league system, playing for Salem (1984), Redwood (1985), Midland (1986–87) and Edmonton (1988), before joining the Angels in April 1989.

In two games for the Angels, Brady hit 1-for-2 (a double) with one run batted in for a .500 batting average. He was returned to Edmonton for the rest of the 1989 season. After that, he played for the 1990 Phoenix Firebirds of the Pacific Coast League. In seven minor league seasons, he hit .269 with 49 home runs, 312 RBI, and a .341 on-base percentage in 670 games.

See also
1989 California Angels season
Los Angeles Angels of Anaheim all-time roster

References

External links

1962 births
Living people
American expatriate baseball players in Canada
Baseball players from New York (state)
California Angels players
Edmonton Trappers players
Major League Baseball right fielders
Midland Angels players
New York Institute of Technology alumni
People from Elmhurst, Queens
Phoenix Firebirds players
Redwood Pioneers players
Salem Angels players
People from Malverne, New York